Waring Point is a headland of the Chukchi Sea. Administratively, it belongs to the Chukotka, Russian Federation. 

It is the easternmost point of Wrangel Island.

This headland was named in 1881 after Lieutenant Waring of USS Rodgers, commanded by Lieutenant Robert M. Berry. Lt. Waring was the first to land at this point.  

Very large numbers of birds are nesting on the cliffs of this cape, including the horned puffin, tufted puffin, thick-billed murre, glaucous gull and pelagic cormorant.

References

External links
 
Wrangel Island
Headlands of Chukotka Autonomous Okrug
Chukchi Sea